Simous is a genus of beetles in the family Carabidae, containing the following species:

 Simous aeneus (Laferte-Senectere, 1851) 
 Simous annamita Csiki, 1931 
 Simous borneensis Bates, 1889 
 Simous laevissimus (Chaudoir, 1882) 
 Simous lampros Bates, 1892 
 Simous mouhotii (Chaudoir, 1869)  
 Simous nigriceps (Wiedemann, 1821) 
 Simous nubilus Andrewes, 1933 
 Simous obscurus Louwerens, 1951 
 Simous viridissimus Louwerens, 1951

References

Licininae